Live at the BBC: 1967–1970 is a two-disc album by The Moody Blues.  Released in 2007, it features forty-one live recordings of various performances for the BBC between 1967 and 1970.  The album features multiple recordings of some songs, so they are listed more than once. In 2019 the album was reissued on a numbered limited edition triple-coloured vinyl disk set.

Track listing
All songs written by Justin Hayward, except where noted.

Disc One

 "Fly Me High" - 3:00
 "Don't Let Me Be Misunderstood" (Bennie Benjamin/Gloria Caldwell/Sol Marcus) – 2:23
 "Love and Beauty" (Mike Pinder) – 2:12
 "Leave This Man Alone" – 2:52
 "Peak Hour" (John Lodge) – 3:21
 "Nights in White Satin" – 4:22
 "Fly Me High" – 2:45
 "Twilight Time" (Ray Thomas) – 2:08
 "Dr. Livingstone, I Presume" (Thomas) – 2:58
 "Voices in the Sky" – 2:50
 "Ride My See-Saw" (Lodge) – 3:49
 "The Best Way to Travel" (Pinder) – 3:38
 "Voices in the Sky" – 3:53
 "Dr. Livingstone, I Presume" (Thomas) – 2:58
 "Peak Hour"(Lodge) – 3:29
 "Tuesday Afternoon" – 3:24
 "Ride My See-Saw" (Lodge) – 2:28
 "Lovely to See You" – 2:25
 "Never Comes the Day" – 4:33
 "To Share Our Love" (Lodge) – 2:21
 "Send Me No Wine" (Lodge) – 2:40
 "So Deep Within You" (Pinder) – 3:06
 "Lovely to See You" – 2:15

Disc Two
 "Nights in White Satin" – 4:40
 "Another Morning" (Thomas) – 2:58
 "Ride My See-Saw" (Lodge) – 3:46
 "Dr. Livingstone, I Presume" (Thomas) – 3:01
 "House of Four Doors" (Lodge) – 5:56
 "Voices in the Sky" – 3:23
 "The Best Way to Travel" (Pinder) – 3:22
 "Visions of Paradise" (Hayward, Thomas) – 1:14
 "The Actor" – 1:50
 "Gypsy (Of a Strange and Distant Time)" – 3:07
 "The Sunset" (Pinder) – 3:47
 "Never Comes the Day" – 4:21
 "Are You Sitting Comfortably?" (Hayward, Thomas) – 3:00
 "The Dream" (Graeme Edge) – 0:52
 "Have You Heard" (Pinder) – 5:42
 "Nights in White Satin" – 3:03
 "Legend of a Mind" (Thomas) – 4:34
 "Question" – 4:55

Personnel
Justin Hayward - vocals, guitar, sitar
John Lodge - vocals, bass
Ray Thomas - vocals, flute, percussion
Graeme Edge - drums, percussion
Mike Pinder - vocals, mellotron, keyboards

BBC Radio recordings
The Moody Blues compilation albums
The Moody Blues live albums
2007 live albums
2007 compilation albums